James Otis may refer to:

James Otis Sr. (1702–1778), Massachusetts lawyer and public official
James Otis Jr. (1725–1783), American revolutionary politician from Massachusetts
James Otis (mayor) (1826–1875), mayor of San Francisco, California
James Otis (New York politician) (1836–1898), member of the New York State Senate and a society leader during the Gilded Age
James C. Otis (1912–1993), Justice of the Minnesota Supreme Court 
James Otis (actor) (1943–2020), American film and television actor
James Otis Kaler (1848–1912), (pen name: James Otis), American journalist and children's author
Jim Otis (born 1948), American football player